Alfredo Marcano (January 17, 1947 – April 5, 2009) was a Venezuelan professional boxer who competed from 1966 to 1975. He held the world junior lightweight title.

Professional boxing career
During his career, Marcano won the WBA and lineal super featherweight titles. Marcano challenged for the WBA title on July 29, 1971, against Hiroshi Kobayashi. The fight took place in Japan—the home country of the champion. Marcano won the fight with a tenth round technical knockout. After becoming champion, Marcano returned to Venezuela to make his first defence, against the Japanese challenger Kenji Iwata, Marcano once again won with a knockout. It was to be the only defence of his title, as he lost a unanimous decision to Ben Villaflor in his next fight. After the fight Marcano went undefeated until September 1974, when he unsuccessfully challenged Bobby Chacon for the vacant WBC featherweight title—the fight ended in the ninth round with Chacon scoring a knockout. In March 1975 he was knocked out again, this time by Art Hafey, in what was to be his final fight. Maracano died in April 2009 at the age of 62.

See also
List of super featherweight boxing champions
List of WBA world champions

References

External links
 
Alfredo Marcano - CBZ Profile

Super-featherweight boxers
World Boxing Association champions
People from Cumaná
1947 births
2009 deaths
Venezuelan male boxers
World super-featherweight boxing champions